Rasmekeyevo (Räsmäkäy) is a rural locality (a village) in Rasmekeyevsky Selsoviet, Kushnarenkovsky District, Bashkortostan, Russia. The population was 224 as of 2010. There are 3 streets.

Geography 
Rasmekeyevo is located 21 km southwest of Kushnarenkovo (the district's administrative centre) by road. Kupayevo is the nearest rural locality.

References 

Rural localities in Kushnarenkovsky District